Walbottle is a village in Tyne and Wear. It is a western suburb of Newcastle upon Tyne. The village name, recorded in 1176 as "Walbotl", is derived from the Old English botl (building) on Hadrian's Wall. There are a number of Northumbrian villages which are suffixed "-bottle".

Bede, in his Ecclesiastical History of the English People, refers to a royal estate called Ad Murum near the Roman Wall where, in 653 AD, the King of the Middle Angles, Peada, and the King of the East Saxons, Sigeberht, were both baptised as Christians by Bishop Finan, having been persuaded to do so by King Oswy of Northumbria. Historians have identified Ad Murum as a possible reference to Walbottle.

Ann Potter, the mother of Lord Armstrong, the famous industrialist, was born at Walbottle Hall in 1780 and lived there until 1801.

Notable people
 Both George Stephenson and Timothy Hackworth, who can fairly be called the joint fathers of steam railways, worked at Walbottle Colliery in the early 19th century. The railway pioneer William Hedley also worked in the colliery.
 Nixon introduced wrought iron rails (rather than cast iron) with a square cross-section on the Walbottle coal Railroad in 1803.

Born in Walbottle
 Thomas Tommy Browell (1892–1955), professional footballer.
 Richard Armstrong (author) (1903–1986), who wrote for both adults and children. He was the winner of the Carnegie Medal in 1948 for his book Sea Change. He is also known for a biography of Grace Darling in which he challenges the conventional story: Grace Darling: Maid and Myth. He is often described on the cover of his books as "author and mariner".
 William Wilson (1809–1862). Mechanical Engineer who pioneered railways in Germany in the nineteenth century.

Worked in Walbottle
David Besford, ( 1946 - ) former pupil of Walbottle Grammar School, returned to spend seven years as Head Teacher.
 William Robert Messer, ( 1948 - ) former pupil of Walbottle Grammar School (1959-1966) returned as Head of Art and Design from 1980 to 2008. Involved in the rebuild of Walbottle Campus 2006–2008.

References

External links
 
 Westerhope Online: Community & Radio

Villages in Tyne and Wear
Geography of Newcastle upon Tyne